Goldsmith is a variation of the surname Smith. Notable persons with that surname include:

A 
 Adrian Goldsmith (1921–1961), Australian flying ace of WWII
 Alfred Norton Goldsmith (1888–1974), American electrical engineer
 Andrea Goldsmith (engineer), American electrical engineer
 Andrea Goldsmith (writer) (born 1950), Australian writer and novelist
 Lady Annabel Goldsmith (born 1934), English socialite
 Arthur S. Goldsmith (1909–1995), American bridge player

B
 Barbara Goldsmith (1931–2016), American writer
 Ben Goldsmith (born 1980), English financier and environmentalist
 Bernard Goldsmith (1832–1901), mayor of Portland, Oregon
 Bethany Goldsmith (1927-2004), All-American Girls Professional Baseball League player
 Bobby Goldsmith (1946–1984), Australian athlete, gay activist, and AIDS victim
 Bruce Goldsmith, British paraglider pilot and designer

C
 Carol Goldsmith, American news anchor
 Carole Goldsmith aka Carole Middleton (born 1955), British businesswoman, mother of Catherine, Duchess of Cambridge
 Cele Goldsmith Lalli (1933–2002), American editor
 Christy Goldsmith Romero, American lawyer, Special Inspector General of the Troubled Asset Relief Program
 Clio Goldsmith (born 1957), French actress

E
 Edward Goldsmith (1928–2009), Anglo-French environmentalist, author and professor

F
 Francis Edward Goldsmith (c. 1820–1875), medical doctor in Northern Territory under B. T. Finniss
 Frank Goldsmith (1878–1967), British Conservative MP and luxury hotel owner
 Frank John William Goldsmith (1902–1982), British author and Titanic survivor
Fred Goldsmith (American football) (born 1944), American football coach
 Fred Goldsmith (Australian rules footballer) (1932–2017), Victorian Football League player
 Fred Goldsmith (baseball) (1852–1939), American baseball pitcher

G
 George Goldsmith (1905–1974), English footballer
 Glen Goldsmith (born 1965), English singer
 Grace Arabell Goldsmith (1904–1975), American physician

H
 H. Hill Goldsmith, American developmental psychologist
 Harold Goldsmith (1930–2004), American foil and épée fencer
 Harvey Goldsmith (born 1946), English concert promoter
 Henry Goldsmith (1885–1915), British rower

J
 Jack L. Goldsmith (born 1962), American legal scholar and author
 Jan Goldsmith (born 1951), American Republican politician; San Diego City Attorney
 Sir James Goldsmith (1933–1997), Anglo-French business tycoon
 Jemima Goldsmith (born 1974), English socialite
 Jerry Goldsmith (1929–2004), American composer
 Jo-ann Goldsmith, band member of Canada's Broken Social Scene
 Joel Goldsmith (born 1957), American film composer, son of Jerry Goldsmith
 Joel S. Goldsmith (1892–1964), American religious leader and author
 John Goldsmith (linguist) (born 1951), American linguistics professor
 John G. Goldsmith (1909–1972), British member of SOE during WWII
 Jonathan Goldsmith (born 1938), American actor
 Jonathan Goldsmith (musician), Canadian composer and musician
 Judy Goldsmith, American feminist academic and activist

K
 Kenneth Goldsmith (born 1961), American poet and academic

L
 Larkin Goldsmith Mead (1835–1910), American sculptor
 Lewis Goldsmith (c. 1763–1846), Anglo-French publicist
 Lewis Gerhardt Goldsmith, American sailor
 Lillie Cowen, née Goldsmith (1851–1939), Jewish-American translator
 Luba Robin Goldsmith (1879–1931), American physician
Luciana Goldsmith, née Berger (born 1981), British Labour politician
 Lynn Goldsmith (born 1948), American recording artist, film director and photographer

M
 Marie Goldsmith (1862-1933), Russian biologist and anarchist
 Mark A. Goldsmith (born 1952), American federal judge in Michigan
 Marshall Goldsmith (born 1949), American author and management consultant
 Martin Goldsmith (footballer) (born 1962), Welsh footballer
 Martin Goldsmith (radio host) (born 1952), American classical music radio host
 Martin Goldsmith (screenwriter) (1913–1994), American screenwriter and novelist

N
 Nancy Goldsmith (born 1966), Israeli Olympic gymnast
 Nick Goldsmith (born 1971), British TV and video producer

O
 Oli Goldsmith, Canadian artist
 Oliver Goldsmith (c. 1730 – 1774), Irish writer and physician
 Oliver Goldsmith (Canadian poet) (1794–1861), Canadian poet
 Oliver Goldsmith (company) eyewear firm founded by P. Oliver Goldsmith (1890–1947)
 Olivia Goldsmith (1949–2004), American novelist

P
 Pamela Goldsmith-Jones (born 1961), Canadian politician
 Paul Goldsmith (born 1925), American motorcycle and automobile racer
 Paul Goldsmith (politician) (born 1971), New Zealand politician
 Pauline Goldsmith, Northern Irish actress, director and playwright
 Peter Goldsmith, Baron Goldsmith (born 1950), British barrister

R
 Raymond W. Goldsmith (1904–1988), American economist

S
 Saul Goldsmith (1911–1988) New Zealand importer, merchant, and politician
 Sheherazade Goldsmith (born 1974), English environmentalist and author
 Stephen Goldsmith (born 1946), politician; mayor of Indianapolis, 1992–2000
 Steve Goldsmith (cricketer) (born 1964), English cricketer
 Syd Goldsmith (born 1938), American writer

T
 Thomas T. Goldsmith, Jr. (1910–2009), American television and video game pioneer
 Tottie Goldsmith (born 1962), Australian actress and singer

U
 Ulrich K. Goldsmith (1910–2000), American literary scholar

V
 Vince Goldsmith (born 1959), Canadian Football League player

W
 Wally Goldsmith (1849–1915), American professional baseball player
 William Goldsmith (born 1972), American rock drummer

Z
 Zac Goldsmith (born 1975), British Conservative life peer, environmentalist and former MP

See also 
 Goldschmid
 Goldschmidt
 Goldschmied
 Goldschmitt
 Goldsmid (name)
 Gouldsmith
 Aurifaber

English-language surnames
Jewish surnames
Occupational surnames
English-language occupational surnames